Momijigari may refer to:

Leaf peeping, known as momijigari in Japan
Momijigari (film)
Momijigari (play)